Artocarpus hypargyreus is a species of plant in the family Moraceae. It is endemic to China. It is threatened by habitat loss.

References

Flora of China
hypargyreus
Vulnerable plants
Taxonomy articles created by Polbot